HMIS Agra (T254) was a minesweeping trawler of the Royal Indian Navy, one of twenty-two built to the design of the Royal Navy's Basset-class during the Second World War. She was laid down in November 1940, and launched in April 1942, serving until her decommissioning in 1946.

References 

Ships of the Royal Indian Navy
World War II minesweepers of India
1942 ships